Bruno Diekmann (April 19, 1897 – January 11, 1982) was a German politician (SPD) from Kiel and Minister-President of Schleswig-Holstein (1949–1950).

From May 5, 1991 – May 11, 1992, Diekmann was the oldest former Minister-President of Germany, preceded by Max Seydewitz. He is still the oldest Minister-President of the states of the Federal Republic of Germany (FRG), succeeded by Werner Bruschke of the GDR. If only Ministers-President of the FRG are counted, he was the oldest since March 27, 1990, preceded by Hans Ehard.

External links 

1897 births
1982 deaths
Social Democratic Party of Germany politicians
Members of the Landtag of Schleswig-Holstein
Politicians from Kiel
People from the Province of Schleswig-Holstein
Ministers-President of Schleswig-Holstein